Neosybra strandi is a species of beetle in the family Cerambycidae. It was described by Stephan von Breuning in 1939.

It's 11½ mm long and 3⅓ mm wide, and its type locality is Borneo. It was named in honor of Embrik Strand, in whose Festschrift the species description was written.

References

Neosybra
Beetles described in 1939
Taxa named by Stephan von Breuning (entomologist)